Spring Awakening (German: Frühlingserwachen) is a 1924 Austrian silent drama film directed by Jacob Fleck and Luise Fleck and starring Frida Richard, Leopold von Ledebur and Erich Kaiser-Titz. It was adapted from the play of the same name by Frank Wedekind.

Cast
 Charles Willy Kayser
 Leopold von Ledebur
 Erich Kaiser-Titz
 Magnus Stifter
 Frida Richard
 Olga Limburg
 Hertha Müller

See also
Spring Awakening (1929)

References

Bibliography
 Elisabeth Büttner & Christian Dewald. Das tägliche Brennen: eine Geschichte des österreichischen Films von den Anfängen bis 1945, Volume 1. Residenz, 2002.

External links

1924 films
Austrian silent feature films
Austrian black-and-white films
1924 drama films
Austrian drama films
Films directed by Jacob Fleck
Films directed by Luise Fleck
Films based on works by Frank Wedekind
Austrian films based on plays
Coming-of-age drama films
Films about suicide
Films about abortion
Juvenile sexuality in films
Silent drama films